Gregory William Weadick (born February 7, 1954) is a Canadian politician and former Member of the Legislative Assembly of Alberta representing the constituency of Lethbridge-West as a Progressive Conservative.

Early life

Weadick has deep roots in his community as a fourth-generation Lethbridgian. He earned a Bachelor of Science from the University of Lethbridge in 1976, before beginning his career as a certified irrigation design consultant. Weadick has been successful in small business, and is co-owner of Yardworks & Tileworks and president of Frontier Irrigation Inc. He was the founding president of Lethbridge Youth Services and 5th-on-5th Youth Services.

Political career
Weadick was elected to three 3-Year Terms as Alderman for the City of Lethbridge Serving on Lethbridge City Council from October 1992 to October 2001.
During this time He Chaired and Served on Numerous Provincial and Municipal boards and commissions, including Lethbridge Police Commission, Lethbridge and District Exhibition Board.
Weadick won his provincial seat in Lethbridge-West in 2008, where he received 44 percent of the vote. He chairs the Cabinet Policy Committee on the Economy and is a member of the Special Standing Committee on Members Services and the Standing Committee on the Economy.

Weadick was called by Ed Stelmach to serve in the Cabinet as Minister of Advanced Education and Technology. As a Cabinet member, he played a leading role in implementing the Stelmach agenda.

Before entering provincial politics, Weadick was active in municipal government. He served as a city councillor in Lethbridge for nine years, starting in 1991. He was instrumental behind the "pay as you go" budget-balancing strategy. During this time, Weadick participated in Provincial Task Forces on police funding and air transportation.

In 1997, Weadick ran unsuccessfully for the former federal Progressive Conservative Party of Canada in the Lethbridge electoral district.

Personal life

Weadick lives in Lethbridge with his wife, Joanne. Their two children, Josh and Lauren, attend the University of Lethbridge.

Weadick is one of the founders of the Lethbridge Rotary Dragon Boat Festival, founding president of the Lethbridge Youth Foundation and 5th on 5th Youth Services. He spent several years as director of the Lethbridge and District Chamber of Commerce and is a Rotarian.

Election results

References

Progressive Conservative Association of Alberta MLAs
Living people
Lethbridge city councillors
1954 births
Members of the Executive Council of Alberta
People from Centre Wellington
21st-century Canadian politicians